The term garbage eaters can refer to
The Brethren, a secretive American religious movement
Freeganism, an anti-consumerist lifestyle